Margaret of Artois (1285–1311) was the eldest child of Philip of Artois and his wife, Blanche of Brittany. She was a member of the House of Artois. She was married to Louis d'Évreux. By her marriage, Margaret was Countess of Évreux.

Margaret was married to Louis d'Évreux at the Hotel d'Evreux, in Paris, son of Philip III of France by his second wife Maria of Brabant. The couple had five children, all of whom lived into adulthood and each had their own children, they were:
 Marie d'Évreux (1303 – 31 October 1335); married in 1311 John III, Duke of Brabant.
 Charles d'Évreux (1305–1336), Count of Étampes; married Maria de la Cerda, Lady of Lunel, daughter of Ferdinand de la Cerda.
 Philip III of Navarre (1306–1343); married Joan II of Navarre.
 Margaret d'Évreux (1307–1350); married in 1325 William XII of Auvergne, mother of Jeanne I of Auvergne.
 Jeanne d'Évreux (1310–1370); married Charles IV of France.

Margaret died in Paris and was buried in the now-demolished church of the Couvent des Jacobins with her husband and her five children. Margaret died aged twenty five or twenty six.

References

Sources

1285 births
1311 deaths
House of Artois
Countesses of Évreux
13th-century French women
13th-century French people
14th-century French women
14th-century French people